Freelaweb may refer to:

 Freewebs, now Webs, a free website hosting service
 Project Freeweb, a protest against Australian government proposed internet censorship regulations